= Ellen Olga Paige =

Ellen Olga Paige (1879-1957) was a longstanding teacher of home economics at Florida A&M University, who served the university from 1899 to 1942.

== Life ==
Paige initially taught plain sewing and dressmaking at Florida A&M. In 1901 she started a drive to have tennis at the college, and by 1910 there were annual intramural men's and women's championships. By the early 1920s she was in charge of Domestic Arts. In 1932 she helped start women's basketball at Florida A&M.

The Perry-Paige Building at the university is named after Paige and Benjamin Luther Perry Sr.
